Arab Media & Society is an open access peer-reviewed academic journal covering studies on communication. The editor-in-chief is  Hussein Amin (American University in Cairo) and it is published by the Adham Center for Television and Digital Journalism in the School of Global Affairs and Public Policy at the American University in Cairo. The journal was established in 1998. Abdallah Schleifer is an editor-at-large.

References

External links 
 
 Archive

The American University in Cairo
Publications established in 1998
English-language journals
Creative Commons-licensed journals
Communication journals